Al-Farooq (Arabic: الفاروق, "distinguisher") is the title given to one who distinguishes right from wrong. It was a well-known historical title of the second caliph Umar.

Etymology 

According to the Lisān al-'Arab (Arabic dictionary by Ibn Manẓūr) al-Farouq refers to making a distinction between two subjects, and is a person who distinguishes between right and wrong.
Al-Farooq is translated as "discriminator" by Gerald T. Elmore, Richard F. Burton. As, however, the morphophonology of the lexeme farūq is not Arabic, the word seems to be of Syro-Aramaic origin, e.g. pārōqā "Saviour" as for example pointed out by Robert M. Kerr.

History 
According to historical Sunni sources, Muhammad entitled Umar ibn al-Khattab as al-Farooq. The son of Kahn Jahan, the minister of Muhammad bin Tughluq claimed Umar ibn al-Khattab got this title from the Islamic prophet Muhammad. Also Umayyad caliph Sulayman called him discriminator (al-farooq) It is mentioned in the History of Tabari, Taqabat ibn Sad, and Tahdhib "the people of the Book (Jews) were the first to call Umar 'al-Faaruq, we have never heard the Prophet make such reference."

Among historical Shia sources, there is a hadith attributed to Prophet Muhammad in which he entitled Ali ibn Abi Talib as al-Farooq. Abu Dhar al-Ghifari and Salman the Persian narrated some of this Hadithes  
There are also some Shia sources that emphasized that the people of the book called Omar bin al-Khattab as al-Farooq.

See also 

 Al-Farooq, modern biography about Umar
 Al Farooq Omar Bin Al Khattab Mosque, mosque named for him in Dubai
 Alevi
 Ali in the Quran
 Birthplace of Ali ibn Abi Talib
 Farooqi
 List of expeditions of Ali during Muhammad's era
 Sahaba
 Sunni view of Ali
 Omar, television series
 Wali
 Zulfiqar

References 

Arabic words and phrases